Almon may refer to:

People
 Almon (surname)
 Almon (given name)

Places
 Almon, Mateh Binyamin, Israel, a settlement in the West Bank
 Almon, Georgia, United States, an unincorporated community
 Almon, Wisconsin, United States, a town
 Almon (community), Wisconsin, an unincorporated community

Other
 Any tree species of the genus Shorea
 Almon, in Roman mythology a river that was the parent of Larunda